The 2009–10 Buffalo Sabres  season was the 40th season (39th season of play)  of the Buffalo Sabres in the National Hockey League. The season saw the Sabres win the Northeast Division title and return to the playoffs for the first time in three seasons. Ryan Miller won the Vezina Trophy for the first time in his career. The Vezina win was the League-best eight for the Sabres franchise since 1982, when the trophy began being awarded to the NHL's top goaltender. Tyler Myers became the first Sabre to win the Calder Memorial Trophy, for Rookie of the Year, since Tom Barasso won it in the 1983–84 season.

Pre-season 

|- align="center" bgcolor="white"
| 1 || September 17 || Washington Capitals || 3-4 || Buffalo Sabres || Enroth || 17,597 || 0-0-1 || Recap ||
|- align="center" bgcolor="#ccffcc"
| 2 || September 19 || Buffalo Sabres || 3-1 || Detroit Red Wings || Miller || 15,924 || 1-0-1 || Recap ||
|- align="center" bgcolor="#ccffcc"
| 3 || September 21 || Buffalo Sabres || 2-1 || Washington Capitals || Lalime ||  18,075 || 2-0-1 || Recap ||
|- align="center" bgcolor="#ccffcc"
| 4 || September 23 || Toronto Maple Leafs || 2-3 || Buffalo Sabres || Miller || 11,008 || 3-0-1 || Recap ||
|- align="center" bgcolor="ffcccc"
| 5 || September 26 || Buffalo Sabres || 2-3 || Montreal Canadiens || Miller || 21,273 || 3-1-1 || Recap ||
|- align="center" bgcolor="#ccffcc"
| 6 || September 27 || Buffalo Sabres || 7-6 || Toronto Maple Leafs || Lalime || 18,388 || 4-1-1 || Recap ||
|-

Regular season

Divisional standings

Conference standings

Game log 

|- align="center" bgcolor="#ffffff"
| 1 || October 3 || Montreal Canadiens || 1-2 (OTL) || Miller  || HSBC Arena – 18,690 || 0-0-1
|- align="center" bgcolor="#ccffcc"
| 2 || October 8 || Phoenix Coyotes || 2-1 || Miller  || HSBC Arena – 18,690 || 1-0-1
|- align="center" bgcolor="#ccffcc"
| 3 || October 10 || Nashville Predators || 1-0 || Miller || Sommet Center – 14,209 || 2-0-1
|- align="center" bgcolor="#ccffcc"
| 4 || October 13 || Detroit Red Wings || 6-2 || Miller || HSBC Arena – 17,459 || 3-0-1
|- align="center" bgcolor="#ccffcc"
| 5 || October 16 || New York Islanders || 6-3 || Miller || HSBC Arena – 18,690 || 4-0-1
|- align="center" bgcolor="#ffcccc"
| 6 || October 17 || Atlanta Thrashers || 2-4 || Lalime || HSBC Arena – 18,690  || 4-1-1
|- align="center" bgcolor="#ccffcc"
| 7 || October 21 || Florida Panthers || 5-2 || Miller || BankAtlantic Center – 12,607 || 5-1-1
|- align="center" bgcolor="#ccffcc"
| 8 || October 24 || Tampa Bay Lightning || 3-2 (SOW) || Miller  || St. Pete Times Forum – 15,804|| 6-1-1
|- align="center" bgcolor="#ccffcc"
| 9 || October 28 || New Jersey Devils || 4-1 || Miller || Prudential Center – 14,182 || 7-1-1
|- align="center" bgcolor="#ccffcc"
| 10 || October 30 || Toronto Maple Leafs || 3-2 (OTW) || Miller  || HSBC Arena – 18,300 || 8-1-1
|- align="center" bgcolor="#ffcccc"
| 11 || October 31 || New York Islanders || 0-5 || Miller || Nassau Veterans Mem. Coliseum – 8,889 || 8-2-1
|-

|- align="center" bgcolor="#ccffcc"
| 12 || November 4 || New York Islanders || 3-0 || Miller || HSBC Arena – 17,626 || 9-2-1
|- align="center" bgcolor="#ffcccc"
| 13 || November 6 || Philadelphia Flyers || 2-5 || Miller || HSBC Arena – 18,525 || 9-3-1
|- align="center" bgcolor="#ffcccc"
| 14 || November 7 || Boston Bruins || 2-4 || Enroth || TD Garden – 17,565 || 9-4-1
|- align="center" bgcolor="#ccffcc"
| 15 || November 11 || Edmonton Oilers || 3-1 || Miller || HSBC Arena – 17,797 || 10-4-1
|- align="center" bgcolor="#ccffcc"
| 16 || November 13 || Calgary Flames || 2-1 (SOW) || Miller  || HSBC Arena – 18,690 || 11-4-1
|- align="center" bgcolor="#ccffcc"
| 17 || November 14 || Philadelphia Flyers || 3-2 || Miller  || Wachovia Center – 19,641 || 12-4-1
|- align="center" bgcolor="#ffcccc"
| 18 || November 18 || Florida Panthers || 2-6 || Miller  || HSBC Arena – 18,546 || 12-5-1
|- align="center" bgcolor="#ffffff"
| 19 || November 20 || Boston Bruins || 1-2 (OTL) || Miller  || HSBC Arena – 18,291 || 12-5-2
|- align="center" bgcolor="ffcccc"
| 20 || November 21 || Ottawa Senators || 3-5 || Lalime || Scotiabank Place – 17,206 || 12-6-2
|- align="center" bgcolor="ffcccc"
| 21 || November 25 || Washington Capitals || 0-2 || Miller  || Verizon Center – 18,277 || 12-7-2
|- align="center" bgcolor="#ccffcc"
| 22 || November 27 || Philadelphia Flyers || 4-2 || Miller  || Wachovia Center – 19,673 || 13-7-2
|- align="center" bgcolor="#ccffcc"
| 23 || November 28 || Carolina Hurricanes || 5-1 || Miller  || HSBC Arena – 18,690 || 14-7-2
|- align="center" bgcolor="#ccffcc"
| 24 || November 30 || Toronto Maple Leafs || 3-0 || Miller  || Air Canada Centre – 19,110 || 15-7-2
|-

|- align="center" bgcolor="#ccffcc"
| 25 || December 3 || Montreal Canadiens || 6-2 || Miller  || HSBC Arena – 18,690 || 16-7-2
|- align="center" bgcolor="ffcccc"
| 26 || December 5 || New York Rangers || 1-2 || Miller  || HSBC Arena – 18,301 || 16-8-2
|- align="center" bgcolor="ffcccc"
| 27 || December 7 || New Jersey Devils || 0-3 || Miller  || HSBC Arena – 18,690 || 16-9-2
|- align="center" bgcolor="#ccffcc"
| 28 || December 9 || Washington Capitals || 3-0 || Miller  || HSBC Arena – 17,982 || 17-9-2
|- align="center" bgcolor="#ccffcc"
| 29 || December 11 || Chicago Blackhawks || 2-1 || Lalime  || HSBC Arena – 18,009 || 18-9-2
|- align="center" bgcolor="#ccffcc"
| 30 || December 12 || New York Rangers || 3-2 || Miller  || Madison Square Garden – 18,200 || 19-9-2
|- align="center" bgcolor="#ccffcc"
| 31 || December 14 || Montreal Canadiens || 4-3 || Miller   || Bell Centre – 21,273 || 20-9-2
|- align="center" bgcolor="ffcccc"
| 32 || December 16 || Ottawa Senators || 0-2 || Miller  || Scotiabank Place – 16,917 || 20-10-2
|- align="center" bgcolor="#ccffcc"
| 33 || December 18 || Toronto Maple Leafs || 5-2 || Miller  || HSBC Arena – 18,159 || 21-10-2
|- align="center"
| 34 || December 19 || Pittsburgh Penguins || 1-2 (OTL) || Lalime  || HSBC Arena – 18,690 || 21-10-3
|- align="center" bgcolor="#ccffcc"
| 35 || December 21 || Toronto Maple Leafs || 3-2 || Miller  || Air Canada Centre – 19,235 || 22-10-3
|- align="center" bgcolor="ffcccc"
| 36 || December 23 || Washington Capitals || 2-5 || Miller  || Verizon Center – 18,277 || 22-11-3
|- align="center"
| 37 || December 26 || Ottawa Senators || 2-3 (OTL) || Miller  || HSBC Arena -18,690 || 22-11-4
|- align="center" bgcolor="#ccffcc"
| 38 || December 27 || St. Louis Blues || 5-3 || Lalime  || Scottrade Center -19,150 || 23-11-4
|- align="center" bgcolor="#ccffcc"
| 39 || December 29 || Pittsburgh Penguins || 4-3 || Lalime || HSBC Arena -18,690 ||24-11-4
|-

|- align="center" bgcolor="#ccffcc"
| 40 || January 1 || Atlanta Thrashers || 4-3 || Miller  || HSBC Arena – 18,690 || 25-11-4
|- align="center" bgcolor="#ccffcc"
| 41 || January 3 || Montreal Canadiens || 1-0 || Miller  || Bell Centre – 21,273 || 26-11-4
|- align="center" bgcolor="#ccffcc"
| 42 || January 6 || Tampa Bay Lightning || 5-3 || Miller  || HSBC Arena – 18,690 || 27-11-4
|- align="center" bgcolor="#ccffcc"
| 43 || January 8 || Toronto Maple Leafs || 3-2 || Miller || HSBC Arena – 18,690 || 28-11-4
|- align="center"
| 44 || January 9 || Colorado Avalanche || 3-4 (OTL) || Lalime || HSBC Arena – 18,690 || 28-11-5
|- align="center" bgcolor="#ccffcc"
| 45 || January 14 || Atlanta Thrashers || 2-1 || Miller || Philips Arena – 11,313 || 29-11-5
|- align="center"
| 46 || January 16 || New York Islanders || 2-3 (SOL) || Miller ||Nassau Veterans Memorial Coliseum – 13,635|| 29-11-6
|- align="center" bgcolor="#ccffcc"
| 47 || January 18 || Phoenix Coyotes || 7-2 || Miller || Jobing.com Arena – 11,309|| 30-11-6
|- align="center" bgcolor="ffcccc"
| 48 || January 19 || Anaheim Ducks || 4-5 || Lalime  || Honda Center – 15,570 || 30-12-6
|- align="center"
| 49 || January 21 || Los Angeles Kings || 3-4 (SOL) || Miller  || Staples Center – 16,884 || 30-12-7
|- align="center" bgcolor="ffcccc"
| 50 || January 23 || San Jose Sharks || 2-5 || Miller  || HP Pavilion – 17,562 || 30-13-7
|- align="center" bgcolor="ffcccc"
| 51 || January 25 || Vancouver Canucks || 2-3 || Miller  || General Motors Place – 18,810 || 30-14-7
|- align="center" bgcolor="#ccffcc"
| 52 || January 27 || New Jersey Devils || 2-1 (SOW) || Miller  || HSBC Arena – 18,690 || 31-14-7
|- align="center" bgcolor="#ccffcc"
| 53 || January 29 || Boston Bruins || 2-1 || Miller  || HSBC Arena – 18690 || 32-14-7
|-

|- align="center" bgcolor="ffcccc"
| 54 || February 1 || Pittsburgh Penguins || 4-5 || Miller  || Mellon Arena – 17,029 || 32-15-7
|- align="center" bgcolor="ffcccc"
| 55 || February 3 || Ottawa Senators || 2-4 || Miller  || HSBC Arena – 18,690 || 32-16-7
|- align="center" bgcolor="ffcccc"
| 56 || February 5 || Carolina Hurricanes || 3-4 || Miller || HSBC Arena – 18,690 || 32-17-7
|- align="center" bgcolor="ffcccc"
| 57 || February 6 || Columbus Blue Jackets || 0-4 || Lalime || Nationwide Arena – 18,576 || 32-18-7
|- align="center"
| 58 || February 9 || Boston Bruins || 3-4 (OT) || Miller || HSBC Arena – 18,690 || 32-18-8
|- align="center"
| 59 || February 11 || Carolina Hurricanes || 2-3 (OT) || Miller || RBC Center – 15,527 || 32-18-9
|- align="center" bgcolor="#ccffcc"
| 60 || February 13 || San Jose Sharks || 3-1 || Miller || HSBC Arena – 18,690 || 33-18-9
|-

|- align="center" bgcolor="ffcccc"
| 61 || March 2 || Pittsburgh Penguins || 2-3 || Lalime || Mellon Arena – 17,132 || 33-19-9
|- align="center" bgcolor="ffcccc"
| 62 || March 3 || Washington Capitals || 1-3 || Miller || HSBC Arena – 18,690 || 33-20-9
|- align="center" bgcolor="#ccffcc"
| 63 || March 5 || Philadelphia Flyers || 3-2 (OT) || Miller || HSBC Arena – 18,690 || 34-20-9
|- align="center" bgcolor="#ccffcc"
| 64 || March 7 || New York Rangers || 2-1 (OT) || Miller || Madison Square Garden – 18,200 || 35-20-9
|- align="center" bgcolor="#ccffcc"
| 65 || March 10 || Dallas Stars || 5-3 || Miller || HSBC Arena – 18,690 || 36-20-9
|- align="center" bgcolor="ffcccc"
| 66 || March 12 || Minnesota Wild || 2-3 || Lalime || HSBC Arena – 18,690 || 36-21-9
|- align="center"
| 67 || March 13 || Detroit Red Wings || 2-3 (OT) || Miller || Joe Louis Arena – 20,066 || 36-21-10
|- align="center"  bgcolor="ffcccc"
| 68 || March 16 || Atlanta Thrashers || 3-4 || Lalime || Philips Arena – 12,540 || 36-22-10
|- align="center" bgcolor="#ccffcc"
| 69 || March 18 || Tampa Bay Lightning || 6-2 || Miller || St. Pete Times Forum – 16,868 || 37-22-10
|- align="center" bgcolor="#ccffcc"
| 70 || March 20 || Florida Panthers || 3-1 || Miller || BankAtlantic Center – 18,217 || 38-22-10
|- align="center" bgcolor="#ccffcc"
| 71 || March 21 || Carolina Hurricanes || 5-3 || Miller || RBC Center – 15,311 || 39-22-10
|- align="center" bgcolor="#ccffcc"
| 72 || March 24 || Montreal Canadiens || 3-2 (SOW) || Miller || HSBC Arena – 18,690 || 40-22-10
|- align="center" bgcolor="ffcccc"
| 73 || March 26 || Ottawa Senators || 2-4 || Miller || HSBC Arena – 18,690 || 40-23-10
|- align="center" bgcolor="#ccffcc"
| 74 || March 27 || Tampa Bay Lightning || 7-1 || Lalime || HSBC Arena – 18,690 || 41-23-10
|- align="center" bgcolor="#ccffcc"
| 75 || March 29 || Boston Bruins || 3-2 || Miller  || TD Garden – 17,565 || 42-23-10
|- align="center" bgcolor="#ccffcc"
| 76 || March 31 || Florida Panthers || 6-2 || Miller || HSBC Arena – 18,690 || 43-23-10
|-

|- align="center" bgcolor="ffcccc"
| 77 || April 1 || Toronto Maple Leafs || 2-4 || Miller || Air Canada Centre || 43-24-10
|- align="center"  bgcolor="ffcccc"
| 78 || April 3 || Montreal Canadiens || 0-3 || Miller || Bell Centre || 43-25-10
|- align="center" bgcolor="#ccffcc"
| 79 || April 6 || New York Rangers || 5-2 || Miller || HSBC Arena || 44-25-10
|- align="center" bgcolor="ffcccc"
| 80 || April 8 || Boston Bruins || 1-3 || Lalime || TD Garden || 44-26-10
|- align="center" bgcolor="#ccffcc"
| 81 || April 10 || Ottawa Senators || 5-2 || Miller || Scotiabank Place || 45-26-10
|- align="center" bgcolor="ffcccc"
| 82 || April 11 || New Jersey Devils || 1-2 || Lalime || Prudential Center || 45-27-10
|-

|-
| 2009–10 Schedule

Playoffs 

The Sabres qualified for the playoffs for the first time in three years. They had not qualified for the playoffs since winning the Presidents' Trophy in the 2006–07 NHL season.

Playoff log

 Scorer of game-winning goal in italics
 Denotes if necessary

Player statistics

Skaters
Note: GP = Games played; G = Goals; A = Assists; Pts = Points; +/− = Plus/minus; PIM = Penalty minutes

Goaltenders
Note: GP = Games played; TOI = Time on ice (minutes); W = Wins; L = Losses; OT = Overtime losses; GA = Goals against; GAA= Goals against average; SA= Shots against; SV= Saves; Sv% = Save percentage; SO= Shutouts

†Denotes player spent time with another team before joining Sabres. Stats reflect time with Sabres only.
‡Traded mid-season. Stats reflect time with Sabres only.

Awards and records

Awards

Records

Milestones

Transactions 
The Sabres have been involved in the following transactions during the 2009–10 season.

Trades

|}

Free agents acquired

Free agents lost

Claimed via waivers

Lost via waivers

Lost via retirement

Player signings

Draft selections

The 2009 NHL Entry Draft was held June 26–27, 2009 at the Bell Centre in Montreal, Quebec.

Notes 

* The Sabres' second-round pick went to the San Jose Sharks as the result of a trade on July 4, 2008 that sent Craig Rivet and a seventh-round pick in 2010 to Buffalo in exchange for a second-round pick in 2010 and this pick.

* The Los Angeles Kings' third-round pick went to the Sabres as the result of a trade on July 4, 2008 that sent Steve Bernier to the Vancouver Canucks for a second-round pick in 2010 and this pick.
Vancouver previously acquired in a trade on July 5, 2006 that sent Dan Cloutier to Los Angeles for a second-round pick in 2007 and this pick (being conditional at time of trade). The condition – Dan Cloutier resigning with the Los Angeles Kings – has been verified on September 27, 2006.

* The Sabres' third-round pick went to the Los Angeles Kings as the result of a trade on June 20, 2008 that sent a first-round pick in 2008 to Buffalo in exchange for a first-round pick in 2008 and this pick.

See also 
 2009–10 NHL season

Farm teams

Portland Pirates 

The Portland Pirates remain Buffalo's top affiliate in the American Hockey League in 2009–10.

References 

Buffalo Sabres seasons
B
B
Buffalo
Buffalo